Disko is an unincorporated community in Fulton and Wabash counties, in the U.S. state of Indiana.

History
Disko was originally known as New Harrisburg, and under the latter name was laid out in 1856.

A post office was established under the name New Harrisburg in 1871, was renamed Disko in 1883, and remained in operation until it was discontinued in 1967.

Geography

References

Unincorporated communities in Fulton County, Indiana
Unincorporated communities in Wabash County, Indiana
Unincorporated communities in Indiana